Statham is a surname. Notable people with the surname include:

 Brian Statham, English cricketer
 Brian Statham (footballer), English football player
 Derek Statham, English football player
 Francis Reginald Statham, Cape writer and composer
 Harry Statham, American basketball coach
 Jason Statham, English actor
 John Statham, MP
 Kyley Statham, Canadian actor
 Nick Statham,  Dutch cricketer
 Nicholas Statham, English jurist
 Henry Heathcote Statham, English architect, journalist and music critic
 Heather Statham, American singer

Fictional characters:
 Alan Statham, fictional doctor in the TV comedy series Green Wing

See also
 Statham, Georgia, city in Barrow County, Georgia, United States
 Statham Peak, a peak on Pourquoi Pas Island
 Statham, a hamlet in the civil parish of Lymm, part of the borough of Warrington, England, UK